Henrik Jakob von Düben (May 31, 1733 – March 25, 1805) was a Swedish freiherr, diplomat, master of ceremonies and hofmarschall.

Biography
Henrik Jakob von Düben was born in Stockholm in 1733 to composer Anders von Düben the Younger and Christina Sparwenfeld. In addition, he was the grandson of composer Gustaf Düben on his father's side and linguist Johan Gabriel Sparwenfeld on his mother's side.

von Düben studied at the University of Uppsala in 1746, and got sent to the Polish-Lithuanian Commonwealth in 1767, where he served as the Swedish envoy to Warsaw.

von Düben had an attentive relationship with the French ballet dancer Élisabeth Soligny, which resulted in von Düben fathering an illegitimate child with Soligny.

von Düben married Julie af Petersens (1765–1791) in 1781, she was a daughter of Herman Petersen and Charlotta Bedoire. von Düben later married his cousin's daughter Gustava Charlotta von Düben in 1795.

Appointments
   Recipient of the Order of the Polar Star.
   Recipient of the Order of Saint Stanislaus .
   Recipient of the Order of the White Eagle .

References

External links

 

1733 births
1805 deaths
Swedish diplomats
Age of Liberty people
18th-century Swedish businesspeople
Swedish people of German descent
Swedish people of Dutch descent
Swedish people of Belgian descent
Uppsala University alumni
Businesspeople from Stockholm
Swedish expatriates in Poland
Barons of Sweden
Ambassadors of Sweden to Poland
Henrik Jakob